Avon Valley may refer to:

 the fertile land in the catchment of the Avon River (Western Australia)
 the Avon Valley Cattle Station, also known as Munja Aboriginal Cattle Station or Munja Aboriginal reserve
 the Avon Valley National Park
 the final Eastern Railway (Western Australia) route through the valley

See also
Avon (disambiguation)
River Avon (disambiguation)